1st Independent Division of Fujian Provincial Military District was formed on April 1, 1967 from the Public Security School of Fujian province. The division was composed of three regiments (1st to 3rd). The division stationed in Fuzhou, Fujian.

In September 1967 the divisional HQ moved to Minhou County.

In July 1969 the division was renamed as 85th Army division() and all its regiments were renamed as follows:
253rd Infantry Regiment (former 1st);
254th Infantry Regiment (former 2nd);
255th Infantry Regiment (former 3rd).

The division was then transferred to 29th Army Corps.

In November 1969 the division moved to Lianjiang County. Artillery Regiment was activated, and the division was put under direct command of Fuzhou Military Region.

In 1970 72nd Garrison Regiment was attached to the division.

From April 1970 the division returned to the 29th Army Corps and soon moved to Putian, Fujian.

The division was disbanded in September 1985. Its 253rd Infantry Regiment was transferred to 93rd Infantry Division, now as 253rd Regiment, 93rd Armed Police Mobile Division.

References

Infantry divisions of the People's Liberation Army
Military units and formations established in 1967
Military units and formations disestablished in 1985